Acrocercops martaella is a moth of the family Gracillariidae. It is known from the Seychelles.

References

martaella
Moths of Africa
Moths described in 1965
Fauna of Seychelles